The Italian Embassy in Berlin is the diplomatic mission of the Italian Republic to Germany, and the seat of the Ambassador of Italy to Germany.

References

Bibliography 
  As described in

External links 
 Official website

Diplomatic missions in Berlin
Diplomatic missions of Italy
Government buildings completed in 1943
1940s architecture
Germany–Italy relations